The Utter Party Massacre was an attack by Native Americans on September 9 or 13, 1860, that killed or captured 29 of a group of 44 emigrants on a fork of the Oregon Trail in Washington Territory (modern day Idaho), United States. 10 survivors were found on October 24, 1860, emaciated and eating the disinterred remains of a party member. Historian Charles Henry Carey described the attack as "more atrocious than any that had preceded it". It was noted as a "rare [occasion] when Indians not only attempted but sustained a prolonged assault on encircled emigrant wagons".

Name
The incident has been referred to by many names. Some have referred to it by family names of party members, including the Van Ornum party massacre, the Myers massacre, the Utter train massacre, and other variations.

It has also been referred to by its location, including Salmon Falls Massacre (referring to Salmon Falls on the Snake River) and the Sinker Creek Tragedy.

The Interstate 84 road sign lists it as the Van Ornum Battle site.

Citations

Bibliography

Further reading

 
 

1860 in Washington Territory
Incidents of cannibalism
Massacres by Native Americans
Oregon Trail
September 1860 events